Barnesiella intestinihominis is a Gram-negative, anaerobic and non-spore-forming bacterium from the genus of Barnesiella which has been isolated from human feces in Tokyo, Japan.

References

External links
Type strain of Barnesiella intestinihominis at BacDive -  the Bacterial Diversity Metadatabase

Bacteroidia
Bacteria described in 2008